Dmitry Olegovich Malykhin (born 13 November 2000) is a Russian football player. He plays for FC Khimki and FC Khimki-M.

Club career
He made his debut for FC Khimki on 28 May 2022 in the return leg of the 2021–22 Russian Premier League relegation play-offs against FC SKA-Khabarovsk. On 13 September 2022, he appeared for Khimki in a Russian Cup game against FC Pari Nizhny Novgorod.

Career statistics

References

External links
 
 
 
 

2000 births
Living people
Russian footballers
Association football midfielders
FC Khimki players
FC Volga Ulyanovsk players
Russian Second League players